The Surveyor program was a NASA program that, from June 1966 through January 1968, sent seven robotic spacecraft to the surface of the Moon. Its primary goal was to demonstrate the feasibility of soft landings on the Moon. The Surveyor craft were the first American spacecraft to achieve soft landing on an extraterrestrial body. The missions called for the craft to travel directly to the Moon on an impact trajectory, a journey that lasted 63 to 65 hours, and ended with a deceleration of just over three minutes to a soft landing. 

The program was implemented by NASA's Jet Propulsion Laboratory (JPL) to prepare for the Apollo program, and started in 1960. JPL selected Hughes Aircraft in 1961 to develop the spacecraft system.  The total cost of the Surveyor program was officially $469 million.

Five of the Surveyor craft successfully soft-landed on the Moon, including the first one. The other two failed: Surveyor 2 crashed at high velocity after a failed mid-course correction, and Surveyor 4 lost contact (possibly exploding) 2.5 minutes before its scheduled touch-down.

All seven spacecraft are still on the Moon; none of the missions included returning them to Earth.  Some parts of Surveyor 3 were returned to Earth by the crew of Apollo 12, which landed near it in 1969.  The camera from this craft is on display at the National Air and Space Museum in Washington, DC.

Goals 

The program performed several other services beyond its primary goal of demonstrating soft landings.  The ability of spacecraft to make midcourse corrections was demonstrated, and the landers carried instruments to help evaluate the suitability of their landing sites for crewed Apollo landings. Several Surveyor spacecraft had robotic shovels designed to test lunar soil mechanics. Before the Soviet Luna 9 mission (landing four months before Surveyor 1) and the Surveyor project, it was unknown how deep the dust on the Moon was. If the dust was too deep, then no astronaut could land. The Surveyor program proved that landings were possible. Some of the Surveyors also had alpha scattering instruments and magnets, which helped determine the chemical composition of the soil.

The simple and reliable mission architecture was a pragmatic approach to solving the most critical space engineering challenges of the time, namely the closed-loop terminal descent guidance and control system, throttleable engines, and the radar systems required for determining the lander's altitude and velocity. The Surveyor missions were the first time that NASA tested such systems in the challenging thermal and radiation environment near the Moon.

Launch and lunar landing 

Each Surveyor mission consisted of a single uncrewed spacecraft designed and built by Hughes Aircraft Company. The launch vehicle was the Atlas-Centaur, which injected the craft directly into trans-lunar flightpath. The craft did not orbit the Moon on reaching it, but directly decelerated from impact trajectory, from 2.6 km/s relative to the Moon before firing retrorockets to a soft landing about 3 minutes 10 seconds later.

Each craft was planned to slow to about 110 m/s (4% of speed before retrofire) by a main solid fuel retrorocket, which fired for 40 seconds starting at an altitude of 75.3 km above the Moon, and then was jettisoned along with the radar unit at 11 km from the surface. The remainder of the trip to the surface, lasting about 2.5 minutes, was handled by smaller doppler radar units and three vernier engines running on liquid fuels fed to them using pressurized helium. (The successful flight profile of Surveyor 5 was given a somewhat shortened vernier flight sequence as a result of a helium leak). The last 3.4 meters to the surface was accomplished in free fall from zero velocity at that height, after the vernier engines were turned off. This resulted in a landing speed of about 3 m/s. The free-fall to the surface was in an attempt to avoid surface contamination by rocket blast.

Surveyor 1 required a total of about 63 hours (2.6 days) to reach the Moon, and Surveyor 5 required 65 hours (2.7 days).

Missions 

Of the seven Surveyor missions, five were successful.

Surveyor 6 was the first spacecraft planned to lift off from the Moon's surface. Surveyor 3 was the first spacecraft to unintentionally lift off from the Moon's surface, which it did twice, due to an anomaly with Surveyor's landing radar, which did not shut off the vernier engines but kept them firing throughout the first touchdown and after it. Apollo 12's Lunar Module Intrepid landed 600 feet from Surveyor 3, as planned. Surveyor 3's TV and telemetry systems were found to have been damaged by its unplanned landings and liftoffs.

Space Race competition 

During the time of the Surveyor missions, the United States was actively involved in the Space Race with the Soviet Union. Thus, the Surveyor 1 landing in June 1966, only four months after the Soviet Luna 9 probe landed in February, was an indication the programs were at similar stages.

See also
Atlas (rocket family)
Luna programme
Lunar Orbiter program
Ranger program
Exploration of the Moon

References

External links
Surveyor (1966–1968)
Surveyor Program Results (PDF) 1969
Surveyor Program Results (Good Quality Color PDF) 1969
Analysis of Surveyor 3 material and photographs returned by Apollo 12 (PDF) 1972
Exploring the Moon: The Surveyor Program
Details of Surveyor 1 launch, and also the entire program
Digitizing the Surveyor Lander Imaging Dataset | Lunar and Planetary Laboratory & Department of Planetary Sciences | The University of Arizona

Missions to the Moon
Derelict landers (spacecraft)